In linguistics, the unidirectionality hypothesis proposes that grammaticalisation works in a single direction. That is, pronouns and prepositions may fuse with verbs or nouns to create new inflectional systems, but inflectional endings do not break off to create new pronouns or prepositions.  The hypothesis is not universally applicable, with some rare counterexamples appearing in unusual circumstances.  

The unidirectionality hypothesis does not claim that linguistic change will occur in any particular instance, only that if it does occur, it will be in the direction of lexical word to grammatical word and not the other way around.  It should not be confused with a denial of lexicalisation, which is more general addition of a word to the lexicon of a language, whether or not that word is derived from an inflectional affix.

A counter-example

One counter-example is the evolution of a new pronoun for "we" out of verbal conjugations in northern dialects of Irish Gaelic. It's as if Spanish hablamos (we speak) were reanalyzed as habla mos, with mos becoming a new pronoun "we" that replaced the existing pronoun nosotros. In Irish this required a rather special set of circumstances. 

Unusually for a European language, Irish is verb-initial, as can be seen in phrases such as 
Chonaic mé thú "I saw you" (literally saw I thee).

In Old Irish the verb was inflected for person, as it still is in the south of Ireland. The verb 'to be' was inflected as follows: 

With such a system, there was no need for pronouns except for emphasis, as is the case with Spanish today. However, in the north of Ireland, the system eroded, and most of the inflectional endings disappeared. The use of the subject pronouns then became obligatory to disambiguate the person of the verb. A similar change has taken place in French, where the loss of most of the verbal endings (in the spoken language at least) has meant that subject pronouns are now required. 

The subject pronouns of modern Irish are the following:

These were added to the verb wherever the inflections had disappeared. Since the subject comes after the verb in Irish, the pronouns effectively replaced the old verbal endings: 

The first-person singular ("I") form is still retained in some areas but appears to be in the process of dropping out and being replaced by the pronoun mé. However, the first-person plural ("we") form—the only ending that was a complete syllable—is robust everywhere, and the pronoun sinn is not used in this situation. This happened not just with the verb 'to be' but with all Irish verbs. 

The unidirectionality hypothesis would predict that this paradigm would either remain as it is, with the pronouns retaining their status as independent words, or else that they might fuse with the verb into a new verbal conjugational system, as existed in Old Irish. However, something more unusual occurred: the pronouns did retain their separate status, but the first-person plural verbal ending -mid was reanalyzed as a pronoun, by analogy with the other persons. Thus Irish has acquired a new pronoun for "we", muid, which can be used as an independent word, for example as an emphatic muide "us": If someone asks "Who is there?", an Irish speaker might reply, Is muide ("It is us"). This new pronoun appears to be replacing the original pronoun sinn.

References
The Evolution of Grammar: Tense, aspect, and modality in the languages of the world. Joan Bybee, Revere Perkins, & William Pagliuca. University of Chicago Press, 1994.

External links
On the Terrible De-Grammaticalization in Hujulukinat : A humorous exploration of radical, rapid violations of the unidirectionality hypothesis.

Historical linguistics